Dmitry Kvach (born 28 June 1974) is a Kazakhstani alpine skier. He competed in the men's giant slalom at the 1998 Winter Olympics.

References

1974 births
Living people
Kazakhstani male alpine skiers
Olympic alpine skiers of Kazakhstan
Alpine skiers at the 1998 Winter Olympics
Place of birth missing (living people)